Esperanza High School (EHS) is a public high school located in Anaheim, California and is part of the Placentia-Yorba Linda Unified School District.

It is a California Distinguished School and is home to various California Interscholastic Federation (CIF) championship athletic programs; it is also home to numerous academic clubs, such as Speech and Debate, Mock Trial, and Academic Decathlon. It is a member of the Century League. The school's colors are cardinal and gold, and its mascot is the Aztec.

The school has two campuses: a main campus and a west campus connected by a pedestrian bridge over Kellogg Drive.  Since 2010, west campus became known as the Freshmen Focus Campus; however, the mathematics and foreign language buildings on this campus are not reserved solely for freshmen. The west campus is the former Orchard Drive Elementary school, which the high school absorbed in 1986.

Current enrollment exceeds 1,700. Most pupils come from nearby Yorba Linda, California, Anaheim and east Placentia.

Accolades 
Esperanza is ranked in the top 25% of Orange County high schools. In 2019, U.S. News & World Report ranked the school #330 within California and #2,154 in the United States. The state ranking is up from #404 in 2017.

Previously, Esperanza was ranked 860 of the "Top 1,300 U.S. High Schools" in MSNBC/Newsweek's 2008 list.

In 2002, EHS was recognized as a California Distinguished School. Later in 2015, it was awarded The California Gold Ribbon Award.

Athletic teams 
 Baseball (1986: national No. 1 per USA Today)
 Men's basketball (CIF Champions, 2017) 
 Women's Basketball (CIF Champions, 1980) 
 Cross country
 Diving
 Football
 Men's Lacrosse
 Soccer (Men's CIF Championship 2004, Women's CIF Championship 2010)
 Softball
 Swimming (Women's CIF Champions 2012)
 Tennis
 Track and Field
 Volleyball (CIF Championships, Men's 1993, 1997, 2002, 2007, CIF & State Champions 2013; Women's 2003, 2005)
 Water Polo (Men's CIF Championship 1992, 1994,2003)
 Women's Lacrosse
 Wrestling
 Women's Golf
 Men's Golf  (Men's CIF Championship 1986)

Esperanza Entertainment Unit 
The Esperanza Entertainment Unit consists of a marching band, concerts bands, color guard, and jazz bands.

Engineering 
Esperanza is one of nine schools selected by the SME Education Foundation's PRIME (Partnership Response in Manufacturing Education).

Notable alumni 

 Joseph M. Acaba, astronaut
 Jarrod Alexander, drummer of Death By Stereo, My Chemical Romance and others
 Moon Bloodgood, actress
 Heather Bown, Olympic volleyball player
 Sabrina Bryan of The Cheetah Girls and Dancing with the Stars
 Ashley Force and sister Courtney Force, drag racers for John Force Racing and daughters of John Force
 Ian Fowles, guitarist of Death By Stereo, The Aquabats, Gerard Way
 Joe Hawley, NFL player
 Jayson Jablonsky, Olympic volleyball player
 Travis Kirschke, NFL player
 Steven Lenhart, major league soccer player for San Jose Earthquakes
 Annie Lin, singer/songwriter
 Keith McDonald, major league baseball player
 Paul Miner and Jim Miner of Death By Stereo
 Michele Mitchell, filmmaker, journalist and author
 David Newhan, major league baseball player
 Kherington Payne, dancer, actress
 Scott Rummell, actor
 Chris Ryall, writer, editor, Power Rangers guest-star 
 Brandon Saller, Alex Varkatzas, and Dan Jacobs of the metalcore band, Atreyu
 Vince Staples, rapper
 KZ Okpala, NBA player
 Mike Simms, MLB player, Houston Astros and Texas Rangers
 Brenden Stai, NFL player
 Alexis Thorpe, actress, known for her role as Cassie Brady on daytime drama Days of Our Lives
Justin Viele, Major League Baseball coach for the San Francisco Giants

References

External links 
 Esperanza H.S. Website
 2006–2007 School Accountability Report Card
 Esperanza Entertainment Unit Website

High schools in Orange County, California
Public high schools in California
1973 establishments in California
Educational institutions established in 1973